Jangal Rural District may refer to:
 Jangal Rural District (Fars Province)
 Jangal Rural District (Razavi Khorasan Province)